Ricardo Alex Yáñez Reveco (born September 27, 1966) is a general officer of the Chilean Carabineros. He is the current General Director of the Carabineros, replacing Mario Rozas on the 19th of November, 2020.

Biography 
Ricardo Yáñez was born in San Fernando. He studied at two institutions, the Jorge Muñoz Silva School from first to sixth grade, and at the San Fernando Institute from seventh grade to fourth grade.

He entered the Carabineros School in 1985, and entered the Carabineros de Chile on January 1, 1986. On December 16, 1988, he was promoted to Second Lieutenant, a position with which he worked for 30 years at the Viña del Mar. On December 16, 2017, he was promoted to General, and was located in Tarapacá. On November 19, 2020, he became the general director of the Carabineros, a degree conceived by President Sebastián Piñera.

References 

Living people
1966 births
Carabineros de Chile